Encephalartos septentrionalis, the Nile cycad, is a species of cycad in South Sudan, northern Uganda, northern Democratic Republic of the Congo (in the Okapi Faunal Reserve), and the interior of the Central African Republic.

Description
It is a cycad with a globose stem, at least partly underground, up to 2 m high and with a diameter of 25-30 cm. 

The leaves, pinnate, 90–150 cm long, are arranged in a crown at the apex of the stem and are supported by a 2.5–5 cm long petiole, without thorns; each leaf is composed of 40-50 pairs of lanceolate leaflets, with entire margins, greyish-green in color.

It is a dioecious species with male specimens that have up to 8-10 ellipsoid cones, 12–20 cm long and 6–8 cm broad, pedunculated, and female specimens with solitary cylindrical, pendulous cones, 23–35 cm long and with a diameter of 18–20 cm, yellowish-brown in color when ripe.

The seeds are coarsely ovoid, covered by a reddish-colored sarcotesta.

References

External links
 
 

septentrionalis
Plants described in 1887